Henrik Bolberg Pedersen (born 15 October 1960) is a Danish trumpeter and flugelhorn player with the Danish Radio Jazz Orchestra.

Collaborations 
Pedersen has also been credited as a session musician for notable artists including (but not limited to):

Tommy Flanagan - Flanagan's Shenanigans (Storyville, 1993) 
Geri Allen - Some Aspects of Water (Storyville, 1996)
Tony Coe
Django Bates
Graham Collier - Winter Oranges (Jazzprint, 2000 [2002])

Awards 
Pedersen placed first in the 1987 edition of the biennial European Jazz Competition. Ben Websterprise1995, Jasaprise 1996 and Palæbarprise 2010

External links 
Henrik Pedersen mini-biography at Danmarks Radio

1960 births
Living people
Danish jazz musicians
Danish trumpeters
Place of birth missing (living people)
21st-century trumpeters